Přikryl (feminine: Přikrylová) is a Czech surname. It may refer to:
 Ondřej Přikryl, Czech poet
 Patrik Prikryl (born 1992), Slovak footballer
 Petr Přikryl, Czech ice hockey player
 Rudolf Prikryl, Austrian politician
 Tomáš Přikryl, Czech footballer
 Vlasta Přikrylová, Czech athlete

See also
 

Czech-language surnames